Konjović (from Serbian "Konj" which means "Horse") is a popular Serbian surname.

It may refer to:
Milan Konjović, Serbian painter
Petar Konjović, Serbian composer
Đorđe Konjović, Serbian basketball player

Serbian surnames